Aisén or Aysén may refer to:

Aisén (name), an African name for a boy or a girl

Places 

Aysén, Chile, a commune in Aysén Province
Aysén Region, one of Chile's administrative divisions
Aysén Province, a province in the Chilean region
Puerto Aysén, the capital city of Aysén Province